Coniopterygoidea is a superfamily in the lacewing order Neuroptera which is considered the basal most linage in the order and sister to all other neuropteran clades.  The superfamily includes the single living family Coniopterygidae (dustywings). In past classifications, Coniopterygoidea was expanded to include Sisyridae (spongillaflies) and placed in the paraphyletic suborder Hemerobiiformia.

References